Driscoll Island is a narrow, ice-covered island  long, lying in Block Bay along the coast of Marie Byrd Land, Antarctica. The feature was partially delineated from air photos taken by the Byrd Antarctic Expedition (1928–30) on the flight of December 5, 1929. The island was completely mapped by the United States Geological Survey, 1959–65, and named by the Advisory Committee on Antarctic Names after Lawrence J. Driscoll, U.S.Navy, a Boatswain's Mate aboard USS Glacier along this coast, 1961–62.

References 

Islands of Marie Byrd Land